The Jamanxim National Park is a national park in the state of Pará, Brazil.

Location

It is in parts of the municipalities of Altamira, Itaituba and Trairão in the state of Pará.
The Trairão National Forest lies to the north.

The park contains the sub-basins of the Jamanxim, Tocantins and Aruri rivers within the Tapajós basin.
It also holds very small parts of the Ratão and Iriri basins.

Vegetation includes open rainforest with vines and palms trees, dense submontane rainforest with emergent canopy and dense alluvial rainforest with uniform canopy. 
The trees include species with high timber value that are subject to intense exploitation pressure and are important for conservation of Amazonian biodiversity. 
They include species such as Hymenaea courbaril, Cedrela odorata, Manilkara huberi, Dipteryx odorata, Dinizia excelsa, Handroanthus impetiginosus, Minquartia guianensis and Copaifera reticulata.
Species with value other than timber include Aspidosperma carapanauba, Carapa guianensis and Brazil nut (Bertholletia excelsa).

Conservation

The park is classified as IUCN protected area category II (national park), so has the purpose of preserving natural ecosystems of great ecological relevance and scenic beauty, enabling the conduct of scientific research, development of educational activities and environmental interpretation, and supporting recreation in contact with nature and ecological tourism.
It was created by decree on 13 February 2006, and is administered by the Chico Mendes Institute for Biodiversity Conservation (ICMBio).
The conservation unit is supported by the Amazon Region Protected Areas Program.
Protected species in the park include the Jaguar (Panthera onca) and Giant otter (Pteronura brasiliensis).

Notes

Sources

2006 establishments in Brazil
National parks of Brazil
Protected areas of Pará
Protected areas established in 2006